The 1999 OFC Men's Olympic Qualifying Tournament took place in December 1999 to determine which Oceania Football Confederation (OFC) member would compete in a play-off against Confederation of African Football (CAF) member to enter the men's football tournament at the 2000 Summer Olympics.

Group stage

Group A

Group B

Knockout stage

Semi-finals

Final
The winner advanced to the OFC–CAF play-off.

References 

OFC Men's Olympic Qualifying Tournament
1999 in Oceanian sport
International association football competitions hosted by New Zealand
Football qualification for the 2000 Summer Olympics
December 1999 sports events in New Zealand